Merritt Cramer Mechem (October 10, 1870 – May 24, 1946) was an American politician who served as territorial Supreme Court justice and fifth governor of New Mexico.

Biography

Early life 
Mechem was born in Ottawa, Franklin County, Kansas to Homer C. Mechem and Martha (Davenport) Mechem. He graduated from public school in Kansas and attended the University of Kansas and Ottawa University in Ottawa, Kansas. He was admitted to the bar in 1893. After practicing law in Fort Smith, Arkansas for ten years, he moved his law practice to Tucumcari, New Mexico at the age of thirty-two in 1903.

Career 
Mechem was appointed by Governor Otero as the district attorney for Quay and Guadalupe Counties of New Mexico, a position he held from 1905 to 1909, being reappointed by Governor Hagerman. He also served as a member of the New Mexico Territorial Council from 1909 to 1911. In 1909 President Taft appointed him a justice of the New Mexico Territorial Supreme Court where he served until 1911. Thereafter he served as a district judge for the Seventh Judicial District in Socorro until 1920, being twice re-elected.

On the twelfth of February 1910, in Santa Fe, Judge Mechem was married to Miss Eleanor Frances O’Heir, a native of Chicago, Illinois.

In September 1917 in a famous attempt to silence the press Judge Mechem convicted the editor of the New Mexican of criminal contempt for publishing a story about the judge’s affidavit in a separate libel case against the newspaper. The contempt conviction was speedily reversed, but the underlying libel case was not dismissed until October 1919.

In 1920 he became the Republican candidate for governor and won by the largest percentage vote of any previous New Mexico gubernatorial election.  He decided not to run for a second term.

In 1923 he opened his law practice in Albuquerque which he maintained until his death. His law offices were in the First National Bank building where he later associated with another former governor, Arthur T. Hannett. He served a term as president of the state bar association, and was a ranking Mason, an affiliate of the Scottish Rite bodies and holder of the thirty-second degree of the Scottish Rite at Santa Fe. He was also a member of the Benevolent and Protective Order of Elks, Sons of the American Revolution, the American Bar Association, and the Albuquerque Lawyers Club.

Electoral history

Governor of New Mexico

Notes

References
 Sobel, Robert and Raimo.  John (1978) "Mechem, Merritt Cramer (1870-1946)" Biographical Directory of the Governors of the United States 1789-1978 (in vol. 3 of four vols.) Meckler Publishing, Westport, CT, 
 "Mechem, Merritt Cramer " Current Biography Yearbook 1946 edition. H.W. Wilson Co., New York
 "Mechem, Merritt Cramer (1870-1946)" The National Cyclopaedia of American Biography (Volume 33, 1947) James T. White & Co., New York

External links
"New Mexico Governor Merritt Cramer Mechem" National Governors Association

1870 births
1946 deaths
Members of the New Mexico Territorial Legislature
New Mexico Territory judges
New Mexico state court judges
Democratic Party governors of New Mexico
University of Kansas alumni
People from Tucumcari, New Mexico
Ottawa University alumni
Sons of the American Revolution
Arkansas lawyers
New Mexico lawyers
Republican Party governors of New Mexico
People from Ottawa, Kansas
Baptists from New Mexico
People from Socorro, New Mexico
Baptists from Kansas